Harry Biss (9 August 1919 New York City – 17 May 1997 Long Beach, New York) was an America jazz pianist who flourished from 1944 to 1952.

He performed and recorded with Georgie Auld, Billie Rogers, George Shaw, Herbie Fields, Buddy Rich, Brew Moore, Gene Roland, Zoot Sims, Terry Gibbs, Allen Eager, and Eddie Bert.

Discography
 Georgie Auld, Handicap (Musicraft, 1990)
 Coleman Hawkins, Rainbow Mist (Delmark, 1992)
 Zoot Sims, Quartets (Prestige, 1956)
 Cal Tjader, Terry Gibbs, Good Vibes (Savoy, 1989)

References 

1919 births
1997 deaths
American jazz pianists
American male pianists
Big band pianists
Musicians from New York (state)
Post-bop pianists
20th-century American pianists
20th-century American male musicians
American male jazz musicians